Hilario "Charlie" Ramos Jr. (born December 17, 1936) is a politician in the American state of Florida. He served in the Florida House of Representatives from 1962 to 1964, representing Monroe County.

References

1936 births
Living people
Members of the Florida House of Representatives
20th-century American politicians
People from Key West, Florida